The 2016 California State Senate election were held on Tuesday, November 8, 2016, with the primary election on June 7, 2016. Voters in the 20 odd-numbered districts of the California State Senate elected their representatives. The elections coincided with the elections for other offices, including for U.S. President and the state assembly.

Only one seat changed hands: the 29th district, which belonged to outgoing former Republican Minority Leader Bob Huff. As a result of the pickup by Democrat Josh Newman, the California Democratic Party regained a two-thirds supermajority in the chamber that it had previously lost in 2014.

Overview

Results

District 1

District 3

District 5

District 7

District 9

District 11

District 13

District 15

District 17

District 19

District 21

District 23

District 25

District 27

District 29

District 31

District 33

District 35

District 37

District 39 

State Senate
California State Senate elections
California State Senate